Eutelsat 25B or Es'hail 1 is Qatar's first satellite. It is a communications satellite operated by Es'hailSat. The satellite is based on a Space Systems/Loral 1300 satellite bus, and was launched into orbit on an Ariane 5 rocket from Kourou Space Center. In 2018 Eutelsat sold its interest in the satellite to Es’hailSat for €135 million.

See also
 Es'hailSat
 Es'hail 2

References

External links
 Eutelsat 25B coverage maps as files
 Eutelsat 25B coverage maps on Google Maps
 Eutelsat 25B real time tracking

Eutelsat satellites
Communications satellites in geostationary orbit
Spacecraft launched in 2013
2013 in Qatar
Space program of Qatar
Ariane commercial payloads
First artificial satellites of a country